ICTUS Records is an avant-garde jazz record label founded in 1976 by Andrea Centazzo and Carla Lugli.

History 
ICTUS in Bologna, Italy
 Andrea Centazzo and his wife at the time, Carla Lugli, founded ICTUS in Bologna, Italy, in 1976.  Centazzo is a drummer, percussionist, and composer. ICTUS folded in 1984 due to financial duress and the divorce of Centazzo and Lugli.

ICTUS in Long Beach, California
 Centazzo revived ICTUS in 2006 in Long Beach, California, initially, to raise funds for Bosnian refugees.  On January 1, 2006, ICTUS released ICTUS Records' 30th Anniversary Collection, a 12-volume CD retrospective of its work.  In 2010, ICTUS released its Ictus 35th Anniversary Collection on 1 CD.

Selected artists 
 Derek Bailey
 Kent Carter
 Andrea Centazzo
 Lol Coxhill
 Andrew Cyrille
 Pierre Favre
 Robert Gluck
 Noboru Jones
 Steve Lacy
 Guido Mazzon
 Aran Ortiz
 Gianluigi Trovesi
 Roberto Zorzi
 Rova Saxophone Quartet
 Confusion Bleue (Chris Kelsey (soprano sax), Nobu Stowe (keyboards), Ross Bonadonna (guitars, alto sax, bass clarinet), Ray Sage (drums), Lee Pemberton (sound))

Other labels and studios by the same name 
 Free jazz artists Ed Summerlin and Don Heckman recorded three albums between 1965 and 1967 on a label of the same name; but that label was not affiliated with that of this article.
 Producciones Ictus, aka ICTUS Studios, is based in Mexico City and is not affiliated

References

External links
 Official site
 Andrea Centazzo

American independent record labels
Jazz record labels
Experimental music record labels
Record labels established in 1976
Record labels disestablished in 1984
Reissue record labels
Mass media in Long Beach, California